Norman Eckley Edsall (3 June 1873 – 1 April 1899) was a sailor in the United States Navy during the Spanish–American War.

Biography

Born in Columbus, Kentucky, Edsall enlisted in the U.S. Navy 27 June 1898. While serving on Philadelphia, Seaman Edsall went ashore with a landing party on 1 April 1899 to suppress hostile natives near Vailele, Samoa. He was killed attempting to carry his wounded commander, Lieutenant Philip Lansdale, to safety, and is buried on Samoa.

Legacy
Two U.S. Navy ships have been named USS Edsall in his honor.

See also
 Second Samoan Civil War
 John R. Monaghan
 Philip Lansdale

References

1873 births
1899 deaths
United States Navy sailors
American military personnel of the Spanish–American War
American military personnel killed in the Spanish–American War
People from Hickman County, Kentucky
Military personnel from Kentucky